Wilson is an English, Scottish, and Northern Irish surname, common in the English-speaking world, with several distinct origins. The name is derived from a patronymic form of Will, a popular medieval name. The medieval Will is derived from any of several names containing Old Norse or the first Germanic element wil, meaning "desire". Possibly the most common of these names was William, derived from elements wil and helm, meaning "desire" and "helmet", "protection". The surname Wilson is first recorded in England as Willeson in 1324 and in Scotland as Wulson in 1405.

It is the seventh most common surname in England, and tenth most common in the United States, occurring 783,051 times as of 2000. Wilson is also now quite common as a surname in many other countries with a large English-speaking population such as Canada, Australia, South Africa, and New Zealand.

Wilson is the third most common surname in Scotland. In the 16th and 17th century the surname was greatly increased in Ulster by the thousands of Scottish settlers and as a result of this settlement it is the most common surname in Northern Ireland.

Wilson can also be a given name.

See also
 Willson, a variant of the surname
 Williamson, another variant of the surname
 Williams, a surname that also means "son of William"
 List of people with surname Wilson
 List of people with given name Wilson

References

English-language surnames
Scottish surnames
Surnames of English origin
Patronymic surnames
English masculine given names
Surnames from given names
es:Wilson